Gregg Vanzo is an American animator. He has worked on several shows, including The Simpsons and Futurama. He is also the founder of Rough Draft Studios.

Career in television 
Gregg Vanzo began his career as an animator on Bill Kroyer's Technological Threat, Steven Spielberg's Amazing Stories and key animator for the short Box Office Bunny before beginning work on The Simpsons in storyboards, directing, and layout artistry. From there, Vanzo became the overseas supervisor on The Critic. Vanzo went on to serve as animation executive producer for Futurama.

Rough Draft Studios 

In 1991, with his wife Nikki, Gregg Vanzo founded Rough Draft Studios in Seoul, South Korea. The studio has produced animation for such shows as The Simpsons, Futurama, Disenchantment, SpongeBob SquarePants, Beavis and Butt-Head, King of the Hill, The Maxx, The Critic and many more.

Later, Rough Draft Studios opened a sister studio in Glendale, California.

Directing credits

The Simpsons episodes 
"There's No Disgrace Like Home" (co-directed with Kent Butterworth)

Futurama episodes 
"Space Pilot 3000" (co-directed with Rich Moore)
"A Fishful of Dollars" (co-directed with Ron Hughart)
"The Problem with Popplers" (co-directed with Chris Sauve)
supervising director on 13 others

References

External links 
 

Living people
Animators from New York (state)
American storyboard artists
American animated film directors
American animated film producers
People from Webster, New York
Television producers from New York (state)
American television directors
American art directors
Year of birth missing (living people)